Castle Falkenstein is a steampunk-themed fantasy role-playing game (RPG) designed by Mike Pondsmith and originally published by R. Talsorian Games in 1994. The game is named for a legendary unbuilt castle in the Bavarian Alps.  Players play the roles of gallant adventurers who take on quests of intrigue and derring-do in the spirit of Victorian adventures such as The Prisoner of Zenda.

Setting 
The game is set on an alternate earth, in the steampunk era of Victorian "New Europa" circa 1870. In addition to humans, New Europa is populated by creatures from fantasy such as dragons and faeries. Fictional characters such as Van Helsing can also be encountered.

Original edition
The game was designed by Mike Pondsmith and published in 1994 by R. Talsorian Games as a 224-page softcover book. Cover art was by William Eaken and Mark Schumann.

System
The game does not use statistics or dice to define a character. Instead, players must choose a general template of a hero (Heroic, Tragic, Flawed, Innocent, Clever, or Fallen). The player then chooses an archetypal career from a long list including Anarchist, Diplomat, Dashing Hussar, Mad Scientist, and Steam Engineer. Each archetype comes with a set of possessions and a few "Strong Suits" (aptitudes) and Skills. The player then starts a character diary to record the details of adventures, beginning with the character’s background and present situation.

Players can also choose to play non-human characters such as dragons, faeries and dwarves, but reviewer Rick Swan noted that "they come with so much baggage, they're barely worth the effort."

Skill resolution is done with an ordinary deck of playing cards rather than dice. At the start of the game, the referee deals everyone four cards, including himself. When a player wants to test a skill, the referee rates the difficulty of the task from 2 to 12. The referee can also play one or more of his cards adding the value of the card or cards to the difficulty rating. The player attempting the task must use his character's relevant skill level plus the value of any cards the player wishes to add. If the character's skill level plus the value of the player's cards equals or betters the task's difficulty level, the character succeeds.

Combat operates using the same system.

Spellcasters use a second deck of cards. When the spellcaster wishes to cast a spell, the player must draw cards from the deck, one card per two minutes of game time, until the sum of the cards equals or exceeds the power of the spell. Even then, success is not guaranteed, and a spell can backfire with disastrous consequences.

Other editions
In 2000, Steve Jackson Games published GURPS Castle Falkenstein under license using the GURPS rule system.

In 2016, Fat Goblin Games signed a deal with R. Talsorian Games to produce new supplements for Castle Falkenstein using the original rules system. The first of these supplements, Curious Creatures, appeared in 2016, and additional supplements were subsequently published.

Reception
In the December 1994 edition of Pyramid, Scott Haring admired the tenor of the game, saying, "This is not a game of sullen anti-heroes, angst and moral dilemmas; this is a grand game of world-spanning plots, pure heroes and diabolical villains. [Designer Mike] Pondsmith has done a great job of setting the stage for grand dramatic battles between good and evil without once letting it descend into melodrama or parody. This is a game that believes in itself and its premise 100%, but without drowning in pretentiousness or self-importance." Haring concluded, "Castle Falkenstein is a breath of fresh air in roleplaying, a game where real heroes matter and don’t have to apologize. The book is physically gorgeous, the game mechanics fit the tone of the game world like a glove, the writing is wonderful, and the game world is enchanting."

In the November–December 1994 edition of Shadis (Issue 16), Ken Cox called this "what has to be one of the most exciting games in the industry." Cox complimented the presentation, commenting, "With its incredible artwork and layout the book fairly transports you into the realms of the world, while not taking away from the exchange of information." He concluded with a strong recommendation, saying, "A sure-fire system with a fantastic world of adventure: isn't that just what we all have been looking for?"

In the February 1995 edition of Dragon (Issue 214), Rick Swan was enthusiastic about the game, calling it "an alternative reality that’s one part fact, ten parts fun house... a crazy quilt of steam-age technology and social anarchy." He recommended the game, saying, "This is about as good as it gets."

In a 1996 reader poll conducted by Arcane magazine to determine the 50 most popular roleplaying games of all time, Castle Falkenstein was ranked 45th.  Editor Paul Pettengale commented: "Castle Falkenstein is one of those games that people tend to either love or hate. It has a unique atmosphere, combining alternate history, Celtic mythology, steampunk and a somewhat whimsical, fairy-tale feel. Likewise, the rulebook itself is quite different from many, being laid out as a novel, with important information pulled out in sidebars, and the rules coming later. This reflects the main thrust of the system, which is heavily geared towards roleplaying and storytelling over game mechanics and numbers, and drops dice in favour of a couple of packs of playing cards."

Awards
Best Roleplaying Rules of 1994 Origins Award, Castle Falkenstein, R. Talsorian Games, Mike Pondsmith
Best Role-Playing Product of 1995 Nigel D. Findley Memorial Award, Castle Falkenstein

Reviews
White Wolf Inphobia #51 (Jan., 1995)
Dragão Brasil #3 (1994) (Portuguese)
Rollespilsmagasinet Fønix (Danish) (Issue 7 - March/April 1995)

References

External links
Castle Falkenstein at the R. Talsorian Blog
Castle Falkenstein at the Fat Goblin Games website.
 Castle Falkenstein NEW official web site (now offline; link points to archive.org copy)
 Castle Falkenstein OLD official web site  (now offline; link points to archive.org copy)

 
Fantasy role-playing games
Mike Pondsmith games
Origins Award winners
R. Talsorian Games games
Role-playing games introduced in 1994
Steampunk role-playing games
Steve Jackson Games games
Role-playing game systems
Science fantasy role-playing games